Annalisa Bossi  born Anneliese Ullstein and then Annalisa Bellani after second marriage (3 November 1915 - 21 February 2015) was an Italian tennis player.

See also
Best result of an Italian tennis player in Grand Slam

References

External links
 

1915 births
2015 deaths
Italian female tennis players
Naturalised citizens of Italy
Naturalised tennis players
Sportspeople from Dresden